Strezh is a rural locality (a passing loop) in Chernushinsky District, Perm Krai, Russia. The population was 14 as of 2010. There is 1 street.

Geography 
Strezh is located 9 km west of Chernushka (the district's administrative centre) by road. Brod is the nearest rural locality.

References 

Rural localities in Chernushinsky District